The 1998 United States Open Championship was the 98th U.S. Open, held June 18–21 at the Lake Course of the Olympic Club in San Francisco, California. Lee Janzen won his second U.S. Open, one stroke ahead of runner-up Payne Stewart. Janzen became the second winner at a U.S. Open at the Olympic Club to come back from seven strokes behind in the final round; Billy Casper also did it in 1966, but on the back nine alone. Stewart rebounded and won the title the next year at Pinehurst, but died four months later in an aviation accident.

Four-time champion Jack Nicklaus, age 58, made the 36-hole cut at the U.S. Open for the final time.

This was the fourth U.S. Open at the Lake Course of the Olympic Club; the first two in 1955 and 1966 ended in playoffs, and 1987 was a one-stroke victory. The U.S. Open returned in 2012, also won by one stroke.

Course layout

Lake Course

Lengths of the course for previous major championships:
, par 70 - 1987 U.S. Open
, par 70 - 1966 U.S. Open
, par 70 - 1955 U.S. Open

Past champions in the field

Made the cut

Missed the cut 

Source:

Round summaries

First round
Thursday, June 18, 1998

Second round
Friday, June 19, 1998

The 36-hole cut was at 147 (+7), and 60 players advanced to the weekend.

Amateurs: Kuchar (-1), Simson (+8), Eger (+9), Taylor (+12), Palmer (+15), Kribel (+18).

Third round
Saturday, June 20, 1998

Final round
Sunday, June 21, 1998

Amateurs: Matt Kuchar (+9)

Scorecard
Final round

Cumulative tournament scores, relative to par
{|class="wikitable" span = 50 style="font-size:85%;
|-
|style="background: Pink;" width=10|
|Birdie
|style="background: PaleGreen;" width=10|
|Bogey
|style="background: Green;" width=10|
|Double bogey
|}
Source:

References

External links
Full results
USOpen.com – 1998

U.S. Open (golf)
Golf in California
Sports competitions in San Francisco
U.S. Open
U.S. Open (golf)
U.S. Open (golf)
U.S. Open (golf)